Tajwal Utli is a village in Abbottabad District of Khyber Pakhtunkhwa province of Pakistan.

References

Populated places in Abbottabad District